This is a list of former students of the Anglican Church school, the Sydney Church of England Grammar School (also known as Shore School) in North Sydney, New South Wales, Australia.

== Academia, education, medicine and science ==

Rhodes Scholars 
1909 - Howard Bullock

1920 - Vernon Haddon Treatt

1935 - Keith Noel Everal Bradfield

1937 - Ian George Esplin

1940 - Basil Holmes Travers

1941 - Eric Brian Jeffcoat Smith

1946 - William Winslow Woodward

1948 - Louis Walter Davies

1952 - Frederick Rawdon Dalrymple

1960 - Malcolm John Swinburn

1964 - John Dyson Heydon

1971 - Richard John Lee

1973 - Ian Alfred Pollard

1975 - Peter Edward King

1982 - Graham Ross Dallas Jones

1995 - Evan Denis Fountain

Academia 
 Vere Gordon Childe - Archeologist at the University of Edinburgh and Institute of Archaeology
 Laurie Fitzhardinge - Historian and Librarian
 John Conrad Jaeger - Mathematician and physicist; chair geophysics at the Australian National University (1951), Elected Fellow of the Royal Society and has an Award (The Jaeger Medal awarded annually by the Australian Academy of Science) named in his honor
 Richard Makinson - Noted physicist and Communist
 Professor Sir Brian Windeyer (1904-1994) - Professor of Therapeutic Radiology; Dean at Middlesex Hospital Medical School, University of London 1942–69; Vice-Chancellor of the University of London 1969-72
 Phillip Wright - former Chancellor of the University of New England (1960 - 1970)

Education 
 Evan Mander-Jones - representative of Australia to the United Nations Educational, Scientific and Cultural Organization's biennial conference in Paris in 1952, Leading Pioneer of technical schools 
 Harold Lusk - former Headmaster of King's College, Auckland
 Basil Holmes Travers - former Headmaster of Shore and Cricketer

Medicine 
 Ian Constable - Founder of the Lions Eye Institute
 Sir Lorimer Dods  - founder of the Children's Medical Research Institute
 Professor Anthony Gill  - researcher, doctor, author
 Maurice Sando - anaesthetist
 Leslie St Vincent Welch - Chief Medical Officer of the Queensland Department of Public Instruction, visited rural schools to aid with an eye disease (sandy blight) that infected 20% of all pupils in the communities

Science and Engineering 
Bill Bradfield - Noted civil engineer
Philip Cox  - architect
Robert Hickson - former Head Architect for the Bank of New South Wales and designed parts of The Armidale School and New England Girls School
James Roy Kinghorn - naturalist and broadcaster

Industry

Finance and Banking 
 James Ashton - former CEO and Chairmen of MLC (1963 - 1969) and board member on the Commonwealth Bank
 Sir John Cadwallader - former President of the Bank of New South Wales
 Robert Hamilton - founder of MIRVAC
 Michael Hawker AM - former CEO of IAG, Former board member of Macquarie Group, and board member of Westpac
 Sir Norman Kater - Former Chairman of the Commercial Banking Company (1966 - 1978) and Colonel Sugar Refinery (1976 - 1978)
 Richard Lee - former CEO of Rothschild Australia (2001) and Rhodes Scholar (1971)
 John Marks - Founder of Development Finance Co. Ltd, an investment bank later purchased by ANZ Bank and Lend Lease
 Hamish McLennan - current Chairman of Magellan Financial Group and REA Group, Former CEO of Network Ten, (2013 - 2015) and current chairman of Rugby Australia
 Jack Massie - Tobacco Manufacturer and Managing director of Commercial Banking Company of Sydney (now NAB), Also a former Cricketer
 Leslie Melville - Noted central banking pioneer and economist, and former vice chancellor of the Australian National University 
 Jack Minnett - co-founder of Ord Minnett
 Sir John Grant Phillips - former Governor of the Reserve Bank of Australia (1968 - 1975)
 Thomas Alfred Playfair - Former Chairman of Perpetual Trustees and The National Bank of Australasia, as well as being a founding member of the United Australia Party
 John Sands - Created the Renal Medicine Unit in the Royal Prince Alfred Hospital, founder of John Sands Holdings and was a board member and director of the Bank of New South Wales
 Alastair Urquhart - chairman of the Sydney stock exchange (later to be known as the Australian Stock Exchange or ASX) from 1959-66
 Tom Waterhouse - CIO of Waterhouse VC, co-founder of ListedReserve.com and a member of the Waterhouse family of gambling fame

Media and Advertising 
 Sir Frank Packer - media proprietor, founder of TCN that would later become the Nine Network
 Thomas Wallace - former advertising executive, CEO of Lintas prior to merger, and CEO of SSC&B-Lintas Australia also lead Australian Government Advertising Advisory Council, and latter helped form the Association of National Advertisers and the Media Council of Australia
 James Warburton - current CEO of Seven West Media

Retail and Services 
 Harold Christmas - founder of Woolworths
 Roger Corbett - board member of Reserve Bank of Australia (for a term of five years, from 2 December 2005); board member of Wal-Mart (2006-); CEO of Woolworths Limited (1999–2006)
 Horace Ireland - former wholesale meat seller and solicitor
 Norman Nock - former director of David Jones and Lord Mayor of Sydney
 Jim Penman - founder of Jim's Group and historian.
 Martin G Seneviratne - previously Chief Financial Officer, SPAM

Other 
 Colin Bell - Noted grazier
 Tim Bristow - private eye, convicted criminal, corporate 'fixer', bouncer, rugby player
 Andrew Mills - Noted grazier
 Bill Pulver - Current CEO of Australian Rugby Union
 Geoffrey Remington - Former chairman of Rolls-Royce Australia

Entertainment, media, and the arts 
 Peter Berner - comedian
 Russell Braddon - author of Naked Island
 Terence Clarke  - composer, director, teacher
 Thomas Cocquerel - actor
 John Edwards - Producer
 Errol Flynn - legendary Hollywood actor known for swashbuckling roles
 Tim Freedman - musician, lead singer and songwriter for The Whitlams
 Frank Hinder - artist
 Eric Campbell - ABC foreign correspondent, author of 'Absurdistan', 'Silly Isles'
 Geoffrey Lehmann - poet, children's writer, lawyer
 David Marr - author, broadcast journalist, and columnist
 Morgan Mellish - award-winning Australian Financial Review journalist, killed in the Garuda Indonesia Flight 200 air accident in 2007
 Jim Moginie - musician with Midnight Oil
 Garry Shead - artist
 Kenneth Slessor - poet and journalist
 Quentin Spedding - former lead editor of Labor Daily
 Tim Storrier  - artist
 Chris Taylor - member of The Chaser team and playwright
 John Wood - actor

Politics, public service, and the law

Lawyers and Judges 
 Sir Adrian Curlewis - former Judge in the NSW Supreme Court and founding member of Palm Beach Surf Club
 Justice John Dyson Heydon  - former Judge of the High Court of Australia
 Richard Gee - former family court judge, victim of family court bombings
 Frank Louat - Former High Court Lawyer
 Sir Alan Mansfield - former Governor of Queensland and former Chief Justice of the Queensland Supreme Court
 Justice Sir William Owen KBE, QC - former Judge on the High Court of Australia (1957), and Chaired the Royal Commission on Espionage (1954 - 1955) 
 Chester Porter - Prominent barrister and second youngest person admitted to the NSW bar
 Justice Sir Dudley Williams KBE, MC, QC - former Judge on the High Court of Australia (1940 - 1958) 
 Gordon John Ford Yuill - inaugural member of the Family Court of Australia, awarded a United Nations Human Rights fellowship as well as having the Yuill scholarship at the Australian National University named after him
 Peter Young AO - former Chief Judge in Equity of the New South Wales Supreme Court

Public Servants 

 John Wilson Crawford - noted Brigadier and recipient of the Distinguished Service Order
 Claude Ewen Cameron - Recipient of the Military Cross
 Gother Clarke - War doctor, Cricketer
 James Henderson - Distinguished Air force Officer and recipient of the Distinguished Service Order
 Alexander Wilkinson - Recipient of the Military Cross (also attended Eton)

Politicians 
David Arblaster - former Minister for Culture, Sport and Recreation and Minister for Tourism (1976) and Member for Mosman (1972–1984), representing the Liberals
John Booth - former Member for Wakehurst (1984–1991), representing the Liberals
Vivian Gordon Bowden - public servant and diplomat
Sir Harold Leslie Boyce - former Lord Mayor of London
John Cockle - former Member for Warringah (1961 - 1966)
 Sir John Gorton  - politician and Prime Minister of Australia, representing the Liberals (also attended Geelong Grammar School)
 Eric Fairweather Harrison - former Member for Deakin and soldier during the First World War
 Gordon Freeth - former Foreign Minister, former Minister for Forest, former High Commissioner to the United Kingdom
Peter King - former Member for Wentworth
Michael MacKellar - former Member for Warringah
Thomas McKay - member of the New South Wales Legislative Council and chairman of committees
Stuart St. Clair - former Member for New England (1998-2001), representing the Nationals
Rob Stokes - Current New South Wales Minister for Infrastructure, the Minister for Cities, and the Minister for Active Transport, and the Member for Pittwater 
Sir Vernon Treatt  - Minister for Justice (1938–1941) Leader of the Opposition (1946–1952), and Member for Woollahra, representing the Liberals

Religion
Cecil Abel - Missionary, educator and author of the preamble to the Papua New Guinean Constitution
Stephen Bradley - Bishop of the Church of England in South Africa
Anthony Grigor-Scott - Minister of the antisemitic "Bible Believers Church", formerly in Sydney, New South Wales, Australia.
Donald Cameron - Bishop of North Sydney
Geoffrey Cranswick - Anglican bishop
Glenn Davies - Archbishop of Sydney
Hamish Jamieson - Bishop of Carpentaria
Donald Robinson  - a former Archbishop of Sydney

Sport

Australian Rules Football 
 Henry Playfair - Australian Football League player with the Geelong Football Club and most recently the Sydney Swans
 Lewis Roberts-Thomson - Australian Football League player with the Sydney Swans
 Sam Wicks - Current player for the Sydney Swans
 Will Edwards - Current player for the Sydney Swans

Cricket 
 Phil Emery - Australian test cricketer
 Jack Gregory - Australian test cricketer
 Leslie Minnett - Australian test cricketer
 Roy Minnett - Australian test cricketer
 Rupert Minnett - Australian test cricketer
 Bob Radford - Australian cricket administrator
 Dr Claude Tozer  - cricketer

Rowing 
 Nick Baxter - Olympic rower
 Peter Dickson - Olympic rower
 John Hudson - Olympic rower
 Jackson Kench -  Australian rowing rower
 Tobias Lister - Australian rowing team
 Brian Lloyd - English Olympic rower
 Alexander Lloyd - Olympic rower
 Hamish Playfair - Australian rowing team
 Nick Purnell - Australian rowing team
 Alexander Purnell - Australian rowing team- Gold Medalist Tokyo 2020 - Men's Coxless 4
 Chris Stevens - Olympic Rower
 Roland Waddington - Olympic rower
 Barclay Wade - Commonwealth and Olympic Games rower
 William Woodward - English Olympic Rower

Rugby 
 Al Baxter - Wallaby
 Owen Crossman - former Wallaby
 David Codey - former Wallaby captain
 Angus Gardner - Australian Rugby Union referee
 Garrick Fay - former Wallaby and Captain of the World XV side in 1977
 Mike Hercus - United States national rugby union team
 Mick Mathers -  Former Wallaby player
 Justin Sampson - sports television personality, professional speaker, former Australian rugby union player
 Haig Sare - rugby union player
 Andrew Smith - Rugby Union
 Phil Waugh - former Wallaby player

Tennis 
 James Duckworth - Australian tennis player
 John Newcombe - tennis player, two-time US Open and three-time Wimbledon champion
 Eric Pockley - Australian tennis player, among the first dozen pupils

Other 
 Glenn Bourke - Olympic Sailor
 Brian Cobcroft - Olympic Equestrian athlete
 Ben Tudhope - snowboarder and Olympic Bronze medalist
 Alex Watson - pentathlete

See also
 List of non-government schools in New South Wales
 List of boarding schools
 Athletic Association of the Great Public Schools of New South Wales

References

External links 
 Sydney Church of England Grammar School
 Shore Old Boys Union

Shore School
Shore School
 
Shore School